Magnus Sterner (born 1 October 1979) is a Swedish snowboarder. He competed in the men's halfpipe event at the 2002 Winter Olympics.

References

External links
 

1979 births
Living people
Swedish male snowboarders
Olympic snowboarders of Sweden
Snowboarders at the 2002 Winter Olympics
People from Leksand Municipality
Sportspeople from Dalarna County
21st-century Swedish people